Balthasar Charles (17 October 1629 – 9 October 1646), Prince of Asturias, Prince of Girona, Duke of Montblanc, Count of Cervera, and Lord of Balaguer, Prince of Viana was heir apparent to all the kingdoms, states and dominions of the Spanish monarchy until his death.

Life and death

The only son of King Philip IV of Spain and his first wife, Elisabeth of France, he was baptized on 4 November 1629 in the Parish of San Juan, Madrid. His godparents were Infanta Maria Anna and Infante Charles, aunt and uncle of the newborn; Inés de Zúñiga y Velasco, Countess of Olivares (wife of the Count-Duke of Olivares) sat on a crystal throne during his baptism, which was said to be the most precious jewel she had seen.

The Countess of Olivares, who was also chief lady-in-waiting to the Queen, worked as a governess to the prince, which gave rise to comments about the control that the Count-Duke of Olivares had on the heir.

On 7 March 1632, he was sworn in before the nobility of Castile as "His Majesty's Heir" and "Prince of these kingdoms of Castile and Leon, and others that are subject to these Crowns, united and incorporated", in a ceremony held at the Monastery of San Jerónimo el Real of Madrid.

His father soon began diplomatic efforts to seek a bride: Archduchess Mariana of Austria, daughter of Holy Roman Emperor Ferdinand III and his paternal aunt, Maria Anna, and therefore his cousin, being chosen; they were betrothed in 1646. Another cousin, the daughter of his mother's sister, Henrietta Maria and her husband, King Charles I of England, Mary, Princess Royal, was also proposed as a potential bride, but was turned down on grounds of religion.

After the Catalan revolt of 1640, Philip IV tried to win over Aragon to raise money and men for the new war front. One of the steps taken towards this end was to bring Balthasar Charles to be sworn as crown prince of the Kingdom of Aragón. The oath was held on 20 August 1645, when the prince was sixteen years old, in the Cathedral of the Savior, Zaragoza, and he was titled as Prince of Gerona, Governor General of Aragon, Duke of Montblanc, Count of Cervera and Lord of the City of Balaguer. Meanwhile, on 13 November 1645, Balthasar Charles was also sworn as heir to the Kingdom of Valencia.

In April 1646, Philip IV, wanting his son to be sworn in as heir apparent to the throne of Navarre, as he had been in Aragon the previous year, moved with him from Madrid to Pamplona, where, after recognizing the privileges of the kingdom of Navarre, the ceremony was solemnly celebrated on 3 May 1646.

After the ceremony, the royal family moved to Zaragoza. On October 5, the eve of second anniversary of the death of Queen Elisabeth, Philip IV and Balthasar Charles attended Vespers that night in her memory. That evening, the prince was ill and the next day, Saturday October 6, he had to stay in bed while the king went to the funeral. The disease, smallpox, spread rapidly, and on Tuesday, October 9, at 8 in the morning, the Archbishop of Saragossa gave him the Last Sacraments. It is said that the Host was exhibited until 3 in the afternoon, when it became a general procession to the Convent of Jesus, which then proceeded to Our Lady of Cogullada and brought in procession to the altar of La Seo where it was surrounded by candles and prayers. At 9 in the evening that same day Prince Balthasar Charles died. His remains were kept in Zaragoza until the night of 16 October, when they were transferred to the Monastery of San Lorenzo de El Escorial. Following his death, his former bride-to-be Mariana married Philip IV.

The king fell into a deep unease as noted in a letter his spiritual advisor, Sister Maria de Agreda:
"The prayers did not lift the spirits of our Lord for the health of my son enjoying his glory. Not agreeing owed him or us otherwise. I'm in the state that you can judge, for I have lost a child I had, so that you you saw him, I really encouraged him much in the midst of all my cares [...] have offered to God this blow, which I confess I have pierced the heart and in this state do not know if dream or truth is what happens for me."

Depictions in art

The figure of Prince Balthasar Charles has endured over time because of the portraits made of him by Velázquez (for example, Prince Balthasar Charles on horseback and Prince Balthasar Charles hunter both in the Museo del Prado, Prince Balthasar Charles with a dwarf in the Museum of Fine Arts, Boston, or the Prince Balthasar Charles in the ring, from the private collection of the Duke of Westminster (London), among others) and Juan Bautista Martinez del Mazo, of which the prince was a great patron ("Portrait of Prince Baltasar Carlos", dated 1635 (Museum of Fine Arts in Budapest) or "Prince Baltasar Carlos at 16 years' (Museo del Prado).

Moreover, many authors devoted their works to the young prince. For example, Diego de Saavedra Fajardo dedicates his most famous work, "Idea of a Christian Political Prince Represented in a Hundred Enterprises" (1640), to the Prince, while Baltasar Gracián dedicated to him, his work The Discreet (1646):

THE DISCREET / DE / LORENZO GRACIAN, / That public / DON Vincencio IVAN/ DE LASTANOSA. / AND / DEDICATED TO / HIS / SERENE HIGHNESS / Don Baltasar Carlos / Prince of Spain / Y / From the New World. / Licensed. / Printed in Huesca, by Iuan / Nogues, Year 1646

For his part, Quevedo dedicated to the late Prince his "Oath of His Royal Highness Prince Don Baltasar Carlos," 23 included in the Muse Clio, 1648 edition of the Spanish Parnassus. The poem was written on the occasion of the swearing in of Prince Balthasar Charles on 7 March 1632 and, even though unfinished, is a very interesting poem by circumstances and technique that is written.

Ancestry

References

External links

Princes of Asturias
Spanish royalty
1629 births
1646 deaths
Heirs apparent who never acceded
Philip IV of Spain
Portuguese infantes
Spanish infantes
Princes of Portugal
Dukes of Montblanc
Deaths from smallpox
Burials in the Pantheon of Infantes at El Escorial
17th-century House of Habsburg
17th-century Spanish people
Royalty and nobility who died as children
Sons of kings